Jean-Michel Sanejouand (18 July 1934 – 18 March 2021) was a French artist. His work ranged from environments to monumental sculptures, from readymade-like objects, to paintings of oneiric landscapes in which (usually) one of his sculptures stands.

Biography
Born in Lyon, France, in 1934, he received a degree in law from the Institut d'études politiques de Lyon in 1955. He lived and worked in Paris between 1959 and 1993.

His work can be encapsulated in a series of distinct periods, which the artist titled.

From 1962 to 1963, he worked on a series of sculptural paintings that he called "Charge-Objets" (English: "Charge-Objects").

From 1969 to 1974 he created a series of works under the general title of "Organisations d'espace" (English: "Space Organizations").

He died 17 March 2021 at his home in Maine-et-Loire, France.

Solo exhibitions
1967 "Première organisation d'espace", Ecole Polytechnique (Paris).
1968 "Deux organisations d'espace", Galerie Yvon Lambert (Paris).
1973 "Les Organisations d'espace de Sanejouand", Centre National d'Art Contemporain (Paris).
1979  "Espaces-Peintures", The Antwerp Gallery, FIAC (Paris).
1982 "Espaces-Peintures", Lens Fine Art Gallery (Antwerp, Belgium).
1986 "Rétrospective: des Charges-Objets aux Espaces-Peintures", Palais des Beaux-Arts (Lyon, France).
1991 "Espaces-Peintures 1978-1986", MAC (Villeneuve d'Ascq, France).
1991 "Les Charges-Objets 1963-1967", Galerie Froment-Putman (Paris).
1995 "Rétrospective 1963-1995", MNAM Centre Georges Pompidou (Paris).
1996 "Peintures", Galerie Barbier, FIAC (Paris).
2002 "Libre et Change", Galerie Chez Valentin (Paris).
2005 "Sanejouand", Le Plateau (Paris).
2011 "Espaces et Cie", Galerie MAM, Drawing now, Carrousel du Louvre (Paris).
2012 "Retrospectivement", Frac des Pays de la Loire (Carquefou), HAB gallery (Nantes), as part of "Jean Michel Sanejouand's year in Pays de la Loire".
2015 "Un peu d'espace(s)", Galerie Art : Concept (Paris).
2018 "Beyond color", Galerie Art : Concept (Paris).
2018 "Operation contact", Galerie Kreo (Paris and London).

Group exhibitions
1967 "Superlund", Lunds Konstall (Sweden). Curator: Pierre Restany. Also featuring: Arman, Christo, Erik Dietman, Yona Friedman, François Morellet, Jean-Pierre Raynaud, Nicolas Schöffer, Constantin Xenakis...
1976 Venice Biennale, French pavilion (Italy). Curator: Pierre Restany. Also featuring: Fred Forest, Raymond Hains, Alain Jacquet, Bertrand Lavier, Jean-Pierre Raynaud...
1986 "Qu'est-ce que l'art français ?" (What is French art ?), Toulouse (France). Curator: Bernard Lamarche-Vadel. Also featuring: Erik Dietman, Robert Filliou, Gérard Garouste, Gérard Gasiorowski, Jacques Villeglé...
1992 Universal Exposition of Seville, French pavilion (Seville, Spain).
1999 "Les Champs de la Sculpture" (Sculptures of Champs-Élysées), where "Le Silence" was first exhibited. Also featuring: Tony Cragg, Erik Dietman, Barry Flanagan, Raymond Hains, Keith Haring, Jean-Pierre Raynaud, Bernar Venet, Lawrence Weiner...
2006 "La force de l'Art", Grand Palais (Paris). Curator: Anne Tronche.
2012 "Ends of the earth: Land Art to 1974", MOCA (Los Angeles, USA).
2015 "Cycle des histoires sans fin", MAMCO (Geneva, Switzerland).
2020 "Platform: Paris/Brussels", David Zwirner's online viewing room.

Monumental sculptures
1996 "Le Silence" (The Silence), a bronze sculpture whose largest version is two meters high. Until 2019, It was installed in a private park of sculptures near Biarritz (France).
2005 Le Magicien (The Magician), a five-meters high bronze, installed in the gardens of Palais Saint-Georges, close to the railway station of Rennes (France).

Collections
Centre Pompidou, Paris
Fonds régional d'art contemporain, Ile de France
Musée d'art contemporain de Lyon
Philadelphia Museum of Art

Bibliography
Les organisations d'espaces de Jean-Michel Sanejouand (1967-1974), Frédéric Herbin and Jean-Michel Sanejouand

Footnotes

External links
Official Website

1934 births
2021 deaths
Modern painters
Modern sculptors
20th-century French painters
20th-century French male artists
French male painters
21st-century French painters
21st-century French male artists
French contemporary artists
20th-century French sculptors
French male sculptors